Bighorn Lake is a reservoir behind Yellowtail Dam within the Bighorn Canyon National Recreation Area, located in northern Wyoming and extending into southern Montana.

Geography

The reservoir is 40 mi (64 km) south of Billings, Montana.   It stretches the entire 72 mi (115 km) length of the Bighorn Canyon at full pool. The Lake was created by the 1965 construction of Yellowtail Dam on the Bighorn River, near Fort Smith, Montana.

Fishing 
Bighorn Lake has a surface area of 5574 acres, because of the dam, streamflow in the river is relatively stable with little daily fluctuation. Bighorn Lake supports a warmwater fishery.

References

See also

Reservoirs in Montana
Reservoirs in Wyoming
Bighorn Canyon National Recreation Area
Reservoirs and dams in National Park Service units
Lakes of Big Horn County, Montana
Lakes of Big Horn County, Wyoming
Lakes of Carbon County, Montana
Buildings and structures in Big Horn County, Montana
Buildings and structures in Carbon County, Montana
Buildings and structures in Big Horn County, Wyoming
1965 establishments in Montana

pl:Jezioro Bighorn